Savaal may refer to:

 Savaal (2014 film), a 2014 Kannada film

 Savaal, a 1981 Tamil film